Christopher John Liddle (born 1 February 1984) is an English cricket player. He is a left-arm seam bowler who bats right-handed.

He started his career with Leicestershire, for whom he played seven first-class matches in the 2005 and 2006 seasons, but only played one limited overs match. In October 2006, Liddle signed with Sussex in October 2006. He mainly represented Sussex in limited overs cricket, taking a career best 5/17 against Middlesex in the T20 competition. In early 2013 he played for Dhaka Gladiators in the Bangladesh Premier League.

He was released by Sussex at the end of the 2015 season, and signed for Gloucestershire.

References

External links

English cricketers
Leicestershire cricketers
Sussex cricketers
Dhaka Dominators cricketers
Cricketers from Middlesbrough
1984 births
Living people
Gloucestershire cricketers
English cricketers of the 21st century